Vexatious (foaled  April 9, 2014) is an American Thoroughbred racehorse and the winner of the 2020 Personal Ensign Stakes.

Career

Vexatious's first race was on October 28, 2016, at Santa Anita, where he came in third. He picked up his first win in a Maiden Special Weight race on November 26, 2016, at Del Mar.

He started competing in stakes races during the 2017 season. Through five stakes races, his best results were 3rd-place finishes at the Grade-2 April 1, 2017 Fair Grounds Oaks and the April 14th, 2017, Grade-3 Fantasy Stakes.

Vexatious did not pick up another win until August 15, 2018, when he won the listed August 15, 2018, CTT and TOC Stakes (Black Type) at Del Mar.

On October 21, 2018, he won his first graded stakes race when he won the Grade-3 2018 Dowager Stakes after Beach Flower was disqualified. Vexatious came into the race at 4:1 odds and received $75,000 for the victory. He followed the victory up with a 3rd-place finish at the November 22nd, 2018, Grade-3 Red Carpet Handicap to close the 2018 season.

He had a disappointing 2019 season going winless. His best results were 2nd-place finishes at the Grade-3 July Modesty Handicap and the August Summer Colony Stakes.

His 2020 season did not start out much better, as he was only able to manage a 5th-place finish in an Allowance Optional Claiming Race, a 3rd-place finish in an Allowance race and a 2nd-place finish at the Grade-2 Ruffian Stakes. His luck finally changed though on August 1, 2020. At 9:1 odds, he defeated favorite Midnight Bisou and captured his first ever Grade-1 victory by winning the Personal Ensign Stakes.

Pedigree

References

2014 racehorse births